Henton D. Elmore (1921 – January 13, 1991) was an American politician. He served as a Democratic member for the 6th district of the Florida House of Representatives.

Life and career 
Elmore was born in Houston County, Alabama. He served in the United States Marine Corps during World War II, and moved to Okaloosa County, Florida in 1953.

In 1966, Elmore was elected to the Florida House of Representatives as the first representative for the newly-established 6th district. He served until 1972, when he was succeeded by Jere Tolton.

Elmore died in January 1991 in Crestview, Florida, at the age of 69.

References 

1921 births
1991 deaths
People from Houston County, Alabama
Democratic Party members of the Florida House of Representatives
20th-century American politicians